Kym Purdy is a former Australian slalom canoeist who competed in the late 1970s. She won a bronze medal in the mixed C-2 event at the 1977 ICF Canoe Slalom World Championships in Spittal.

References

Australian female canoeists
Living people
Year of birth missing (living people)
Medalists at the ICF Canoe Slalom World Championships